Fraydiss is a village in Zgharta District, in the Northern Governorate of Lebanon.

External links
Ehden Family Tree

Populated places in the North Governorate
Zgharta District